Iulia Maria Dan (born 1987) is a Romanian operatic soprano. She was a member of the ensemble of the Hamburg State Opera from 2015 to 2018, and then moved on to the Semperoper in Dresden. She appeared at international opera houses and festivals in leading roles such as Mozart's Fiordiligi and Massenet's Manon, but also in unusual repertoire including Ofelia in the revival of Franco Faccio's Amleto.

Life and career 

Born in Romania, Dan studied singing with Maria Slătinaru-Nistor at the National University of Music Bucharest and won several prizes at singing competitions. In 2011 she made her debut as Gilda in Verdi's Rigoletto at the Romanian National Opera. She was accepted to the studio at the Bavarian State Opera in Munich, joining the ensemble of the State Opera in 2013, first performing smaller roles such as the vixen Schlaukopf in Janáček's The Cunning Little Vixen and Nano in Jenůfa, servants in Verdi's Simon Boccanegra and Die Frau ohne Schatten by Richard Strauss. She advanced to roles such as Papagena in Mozart's Die Zauberflöte, Frasquita in Bizet's Carmen and Gianetta in Donizetti's L'elisir d'amore. In August 2014, Dan starred at the Verbier Festival as Aminta in Mozart's Il re pastore, to great acclaim. She appeared in the title role of Massenet's Manon at the Graz Opera in 2015.

In 2015, she became a member of the Hamburg State Opera, where she appeared in her first season as Rosalinde in Die Fledermaus by Johann Strauss, Countess Almaviva in Mozart's Le nozze di Figaro and Fiordiligi in Così fan tutte, Tatjana in Tchaikovsky's Eugen Onegin and Agathe in Weber's Der Freischütz. She then performed also Mimi in Puccini's La Bohème and Helena in Britten's A Midsummer Night's Dream. She joined the ensemble of the Semperoper in Dresden in 2018.

In the summer of 2016, she performed at the Bregenz Festival as Ofelia in the revival of Franco Faccio's Amleto, alongside Pavel Černoch, Dshamilja Kaiser and Claudio Sgura, directed by Olivier Tambosi and conducted by Paolo Carignani.

Dan also sang in concerts in Barcelona, Bucharest, Gdańsk, Milan and Modena. In 2010, she participated in the world premiere of Felicia Donceanu's Salbe – Monodrama for Soprano and Orchestra.

Roles

Awards 
 2008: Orange Young Musicians Competition, First Prize
 2010: Ionel Perlea National Song Competition, Grand Prize
 2010: Arta Florescu Masters of the Lyrical Art International Competition in Bucharest, Special Prize
 2011: International Hans Gabor Belvedere Singing Competition, Most Promising Young Artist, Graz Opera Special Prize und Soroptimist Prize

References

External links 
 
 
 Iulia Maria Dan on Operabase
 "Beim Zuhören habe ich Gänsehaut gekriegt" (interview, in German), Vorarlberger Nachrichten, 22 July 2016
 

Romanian operatic sopranos
1987 births
Living people
Place of birth missing (living people)